The Camden Catacombs are a system of underground passages in Camden Town in north London underneath part of the Camden markets, constructed in the 19th century, and  owned by Network Rail. They are not true catacombs as they were never used as repositories for dead bodies, instead being an underground area originally used as stables for horses and pit ponies working on the railways.

The catacombs also included an underground pool for canal boats operating on the nearby Regent's Canal. They are not open to visitors owing to danger of flooding.

See also
Catacombs of London

References 

Catacombs
Infrastructure in London
Subterranean London
Buildings and structures in the London Borough of Camden
Caves of London
Camden Town